Carthage is a village in the town of Wilna in Jefferson County, New York, United States. The population was 3,747 at the 2010 census. The village is named after the historic city of Carthage (now Tunisia).

The village of Carthage is along the southern border of the town of Wilna and is east of Watertown.

History 

The original settlement was called "Long Falls" and was settled around 1798.

The village was chartered in 1869. It is one of only twelve villages in New York still incorporated under a charter, the others having incorporated or re-incorporated under the provisions of Village Law.

In 1861, a major fire destroyed about twenty buildings in the village, and a smaller fire at the end of the year destroyed more property. A less destructive fire occurred in 1872. Another large fire in 1884 that spread across the river from West Carthage ruined more than 150 buildings. The First Baptist Church and Cook Memorial Building, State Street Historic District, and United States Post Office are listed on the National Register of Historic Places. In 2002, another fire destroyed eight buildings in the downtown area, displacing nearly 150 residents and leaving a pile of ruin.

Notable people 
 Carla Balenda, film and television actress, born in Carthage in 1925
 Fletcher Brothers, fundamentalist preacher
 John Carpenter, film director, screenwriter, and producer
 Clay Dumaw, film director, screenwriter and producer.  He is best known for his work on Hold 'em, Get Out Alive and Jack Wyatt and the Gun from Hell.
 Casey Powell, Ryan Powell, and Mikey Powell, All-American lacrosse players at Syracuse University and professional Major League Lacrosse players.
 Dave Trembley, Major League Baseball coach, manager and executive

Geography
Carthage is located in eastern Jefferson County at  (43.981118, -75.606849). Its southwestern border is the Black River, which is in part the border with the town of Champion and the village of West Carthage in Jefferson County, and in part the border with the town of Denmark in Lewis County.

The village is located at the junction of New York State Routes 3 and 126. NY-3 leads west  to Watertown, following the Black River, and northeast  to Harrisville. NY-126 leads west by a more direct route  to Watertown and southeast  to Croghan.

Media
Champion Hill, located between Carthage and Watertown, is the birthplace of the majority of Watertown local TV stations. It hosted the original facilities for WWNY-TV (1954–1970) and later WPBS-TV (as WNPE, 1971–1977). WWNY's city of license still officially names Carthage, even though WWNY's studios have now moved to downtown Watertown.

Demographics

At the 2000 census, there were 3,721 people, 1,417 households and 956 families residing in the village. The population density was 1,480.4 per square mile (572.4/km2). There were 1,626 housing units at an average density of 646.9 per square mile (250.1/km2). The racial makeup of the village was 91.32% White, 4.27% African American, 0.21% Native American, 1.05% Asian, 0.05% Pacific Islander, 1.10% from other races, and 1.99% from two or more races. Hispanic or Latino of any race were 2.69% of the population.

There were 1,417 households, of which 36.0% had children under the age of 18 living with them, 49.1% were married couples living together, 14.9% had a female householder with no husband present, and 32.5% were non-families. 27.2% of all households were made up of individuals, and 12.6% had someone living alone who was 65 years of age or older. The average household size was 2.53 and the average family size was 3.08.

Age distribution was 28.3% under the age of 18, 9.0% from 18 to 24, 28.6% from 25 to 44, 19.6% from 45 to 64, and 14.5% who were 65 years of age or older. The median age was 34 years. For every 100 females, there were 91.1 males. For every 100 females age 18 and over, there were 84.9 males.

The median household income was $23,583, and the median family income was $32,083. Males had a median income of $31,397 versus $18,713 for females. The per capita income for the village was $13,029. About 18.6% of families and 23.5% of the population were below the poverty line, including 33.9% of those under age 18 and 14.4% of those age 65 or over.

See also
 Carthage, South Dakota, named after Carthage, New York

References

External links
 Village of Carthage official website
 Information from Chamber of Commerce
 2002 fire
  Photos of the remains of Island Mill, Tannery Island, Carthage
  Photos of old canal and ruins on Guyot and Grape Island, Carthage

Villages in New York (state)
Villages in Jefferson County, New York